Vanacampus margaritifer, also known as the mother-of-pearl pipefish is a species of marine fish belonging to the family Syngnathidae. They can be found inhabiting seaweed and seagrass beds in addition to rocky reefs along the southern and eastern coast of Australia from Brisbane to Perth. Their diet likely consists of small crustaceans. Reproduction occurs through ovoviviparity in which the males brood eggs before giving live birth.

References

External links 

 Vanacampus margaritifer at FishBase
 Vanacampus margaritifer at Fishes of Australia

Syngnathidae
Fish described in 1868
Taxa named by Wilhelm Peters